LNHS may refer to:
 Labogon National High School, Mandaue City, Cebu,  Philippines
 Lake Norman High School, Mooresville, North Carolina, United States
 Lakeville North High School, Lakeville, Minnesota, United States
 Lawrence North High School, Indianapolis, Indiana, United States
 Liberty North High School, Liberty, Missouri, United States
 Liloy National High School, Liloy, Zamboanga del Norte, Philippines
Loy Norrix High School, Kalamazoo, Michigan, United States